Melita may refer to:


Places
 Melite (ancient city), on the site of modern Mdina, Malta
 Melita (ancient port city), near city of Melitopol in southeast Ukraine
 Melita, Manitoba, Canada, a town
 Mljet (Latin: Melita), an island in the Dalmatia region of Croatia
 Melita, Michigan, United States
 Melita Island, Montana, United States

People
 Melita (given name)

Other uses
 Melita (personification), the allegorical figure of Malta
 Melita issue, a series of stamps depicting the allegorical figure
 Melita bullion coins, a series of coins depicting the allegorical figure
 Melita F.C., a football (soccer) club in Malta
 Melita (telecommunications company), a telecommunications company in Malta
 HMS Melita, two warships of the Royal Navy
 Melita Stadium, Chester Hill, New South Wales, Australia
 "Melita", an alternative tune to the hymn "Eternal Father, Strong to Save"
 Melita, a nymph in Greek mythology - see Melite (mythology)

See also 
 Malita, capital of the province of Davao Occidental, Philippines
 Melitta, Germany-based company selling coffee, paper coffee filters, and coffee makers
 Melito (disambiguation)